= Ericka Engelstad =

Norwegian archaeologist (1947–2018)

Ericka Maria Thrash Engelstad (24 February 1947 – 17 July 2018) was a Norwegian archaeologist, who specialised in the Stone Age and in rock art. A graduate of the University of Wisconsin-Madison, she was the editor of the Norwegian Archaeological Review from 1991 to 1996.
